Three Mills Residential Moorings is a community of twenty residential narrowboats moored on the Three Mills Wall River Weir near Three Mills in Mill Meads.

Historically a tidal stretch of water, the residential moorings were converted to non-tidal in preparation for the London 2012 Olympics by the construction of a weir.

Location
Access to the mooring is by two locks; City Mill Lock to the north and the Three Mills Lock in the Prescott Channel

Situated at Three Mills, in the southern section of the intricate Bow Back Rivers network of the lower River Lea tidal channels, the moorings are directly to the north of House Mill which a large tide mill Grade 1 listed building. The House Mill is Britain’s oldest standing mill and the earliest on record, dating back to the Domesday Book

Regeneration
A joint regeneration project between Workspace Group and Newham Council, the development of a residential mooring at Three Mills with onshore facilities to include a garden and service areas was granted in 1998, with amendments in 2008 to reconfigure and improve  the moorings.

The explicit purpose of these plans was to provide affordable housing. Since its inception, Three Mills Residential Moorings has evolved into a ‘vibrant and cohesive community of working Londoners’ on which children have been born and raised.

Originally leased from the London Development Agency by Three Mills Studios, the moorings and surrounding land were purchased in 2011 by Vastint, the developer regenerating Sugar House Island, the 26-acre site next to the moorings. Vastint went on to upgrade facilities, creating a floating laundry, and a floating coal shed and bike store, designed by ARC-ML.

References

Buildings and structures in the London Borough of Newham
Mill Meads
Stratford, London